Following is a list of non-English-language newspapers with English-language subsections.

Austria
 Der Standard (The New York Times International Weekly)

Bosnia
 Dnevni Avaz (The New York Times International Weekly)

Denmark
 The Copenhagen Post
 Børsen
 Jyllands-Posten
 Politiken

Georgia
 24 Saati (The New York Times International Weekly)

Germany
 Bild
 Der Spiegel
 Süddeutsche Zeitung
 Die Zeit

Greece
 Kathimerini

Iceland
 Morgunblaðið

Israel
 Haaretz
 Israel Hayom
 Yediot Ahronot

Italy
 Corriere della Sera
 La Gazzetta dello Sport
 La Repubblica (The New York Times International Weekly)

Japan
 Asahi Shimbun
 Daily Yomiuri
 Mainichi Shimbun
 Nihon Keizai Shimbun

Korea (South)
 Hankyoreh
 Joongang Daily
 Kyunghyang Shinmun
 Yonhap News

Lebanon
 Al Akhbar

Netherlands
 Trouw

Norway
 The Foreigner

Romania
 România Liberă (The New York Times International Weekly)

Russia
 Sport Express

Serbia
 Blic

Slovenia
 Delo (The New York Times International Weekly)

Spain
 Ara
 El País
 Vilaweb

Sweden
 "The Local"

Taiwan
 The United Daily News (The New York Times International Weekly)

Turkey

Venezuela
 El Universal

See also

 Lists of newspapers

Lists of newspapers by language